The 2003 Nigerian Senate election in Katsina State was held on April 12, 2003, to elect members of the Nigerian Senate to represent Katsina State. Mahmud Kanti Bello representing Katsina North and Abu Ibrahim representing Katsina South won on the platform of All Nigeria Peoples Party, while Umar Ibrahim Tsauri representing Katsina Central won on the platform of the Peoples Democratic Party.

Overview

Summary

Results

Katsina North 
The election was won by Mahmud Kanti Bello of the All Nigeria Peoples Party.

Katsina South 
The election was won by Abu Ibrahim of the All Nigeria Peoples Party.

Katsina Central 
The election was won by Umar Ibrahim Tsauri of the Peoples Democratic Party.

References 

April 2003 events in Nigeria
Katsina State Senate elections
Kats